Football Club Chirpan are a Bulgarian football club based in Chirpan, who compete in the Regional Group – zone Stara Zagora, the fourth level of Bulgarian football.

Honours
Cup of the Soviet Army
 Runners-up: 1983

History
The club was founded as Yavorov in 1929. The team finally became known as FC Chirpan in 1981.

In 1983, as a B Group team, they contested the Cup of the Soviet Army Final for the only time in their history, losing 3–1 to Lokomotiv Plovdiv.

References

External links
 Chirpan at Bulgarian Club Directory

Chirpan
1929 establishments in Bulgaria